If I Were Your Woman may refer to:

If I Were Your Woman, a 1971 album by Gladys Knight & the Pips
"If I Were Your Woman" (song), a 1970 song by Gladys Knight & the Pips
If I Were Your Woman (Stephanie Mills album), 1987